Michigan is a state located in the Midwestern United States. According to the 2020 United States Census, Michigan is the 10th most populous state with  inhabitants and the 22nd largest by land area spanning  of land. Michigan is divided into 83 counties and contains 1773  municipalities consisting of cities, villages and townships. Specifically, Michigan has 276 cities, 257 villages, and 1,240 townships.

The largest municipality by population in Michigan is Detroit with 639,111 residents; the smallest municipality by population is Pointe Aux Barques Township with 10 residents.

Municipalities may be incorporated as cities, villages, or charter townships, which are unique to Michigan. General law townships are unincorporated but provide some municipal services. Cities are not subject to a township's jurisdiction, but villages remain part of the township in which they are located; village residents pay both township and village taxes, and share services with the township. Since all Michigan residents who do not live in a city live in a township, a village's population is counted in the population of the township in which it is located.

List of municipalities

See also
 Administrative divisions of Michigan
 List of census-designated places in Michigan
 List of counties in Michigan

References

External links

 Local Government links from Michigan.gov
 National Association of Towns and Townships
 The Michigan Townships Association
 Michigan Municipal League

Michigan
Michigan
Mississippi
Michigan
Local government in Michigan
Cities, villages, and townships